Inbetween is the second studio album by Swedish girlband Bubbles, released on 4 November 2002. It produced two hit singles on the Swedish charts. The song "Somewhere" entered into the charts on 26 April 2002. It peaked at number 10 and remained on the charts for 12 weeks, and it was also included on the Ice Age film. Then on 24 October 2002, "Round 'N' Round" entered into the charts and peaked at number 30, where it stayed for 20 weeks.

Track listing
CD 1
Excited – 3:02
What's Done Is Done – 2:58
Round n Round – 3:36
Crazy – 3:40
Somewhere – 3:45
Fall in Love – 3:39
Rock The World (2002 Reggae Version) – 2:50
The Only Way Is Up – 2:51
Get Down – 2:59
You – 3:26
Save Me – 3:09

CD 2
Video CD-ROM
Round n Round
Somewhere
Karaoke CD-ROM
Round n Round
What's Done Is Done
You
The Only Way Is Up
Excited
Fall in Love
Rock The World (2002 Reggae Version)
Crazy
Bonus Mixes AUDIO
Rock The World (Bonus 2002 Dance Version) – 3:35
Somewhere (Bonus Radio Version) – 3:38
What's Done Is Done (Bonus Remix) – 3:05
Fall in Love (Bonus Remix) – 3:18
Excited (Bonus Remix) – 3:22
Crazy (Bonus Extended Version) – 5:06

Personnel
Caroline Ljungström
Sandra Joxelius
Patricia Joxelius
Hannah Steffenburg
Jenny Andersén (Yenny)

References

2002 albums
Bubbles (band) albums